Mark D. Venturini (January 10, 1961 – February 14, 1996) was an American actor best known for his roles as Suicide in a cult classic film The Return of the Living Dead and Vic in Friday the 13th: A New Beginning.

Personal life and career
Mark Venturini was born to parents Osvaldo and Carmelina Venturini (née DeAngelis) and raised in Illinois. He had two brothers, Ralph, Patrick and a sister Emily. He attended West Leyden High School where he played football and wrestled. After graduation, he quickly pursued his acting career. He moved to California in his early 20s and began his acting career. His father owned a sandwich store in Illinois called Ozzie's. His children, including Mark, often worked there to help out.

He appeared as a contestant on Episode #4792D of The Price Is Right (aired 2/8/83), making it up on stage and winning prizes in the Clock Game but going over in the Showcase Showdown spins.

He was perhaps best known for his role in movies like Friday the 13th: A New Beginning (1985) as Vic, and The Return of the Living Dead as Suicide (1985). Venturini's final role was in the movie Out-of-Sync (1995). He made guest appearances on television series like Fantasy Island, Knight Rider, Charles in Charge, Murder, She Wrote, Falcon Crest and Space Rangers.

Venturini died from leukemia on Valentine's Day 1996 at age 35. He was buried in Queen of Heaven Cemetery in Hillside, Illinois.

Filmography

Movies

Television

References

External links
 

1961 births
1996 deaths
American male film actors
American male television actors
Male actors from Illinois
Deaths from leukemia
20th-century American male actors